Axel Poniatowski (born 3 August 1951) was a member of the National Assembly of France from 2002 to 2017. He represented Val-d'Oise's 2nd constituency, as a member of the Union for a Popular Movement.

Biography
Prince Axel Poniatowski was born on 3 August 1951 in Rabat, Morocco. He grew up in Morocco and in the United States, following his father the diplomat Michel Poniatowski. Later, he also lived in the US for five more years, and in Saudi Arabia for three years. He was the mayor of Isle-Adam from 1999 to 2017.
, and the Representative of Val d'Oise from 2002 to 2017. He served as the President of the foreign affairs commission in the French National Assembly. He was defeated in the 2017 election by Guillaume Vuilletet of La République En Marche! (LREM). He is a distant relative of the last king of Poland Stanisław II August and of Marshal Józef Poniatowski.

He worked in the private sector for 25 years. He speaks English, Spanish, and some Arabic. In 2008, he supported Barack Obama.

See also
 Poniatowski family

References

External links

 

1951 births
Living people
French people of Polish descent
Axel
Union for a Popular Movement politicians
Mayors of places in Île-de-France
ISG Business School alumni
Deputies of the 12th National Assembly of the French Fifth Republic
Deputies of the 13th National Assembly of the French Fifth Republic
Deputies of the 14th National Assembly of the French Fifth Republic